Euspondylus guentheri, Günther's sun tegus, is a species of lizard in the family Gymnophthalmidae. It is endemic to Ecuador, and has also been reported from Peru. The tegus lives in lowland tropical and subtropical forest habitats.The species epithet is in honour of Albert Günther, a German-born British zoologist. They are mostly diurnal, spending time in low branches or basking on the ground. If threatened, the lizards will run for cover.

Distribution 
Sources differ on Euspondylus guentheri's altitude range; one source states it is found in altitudes of 290 to 420 m, another gives a potential distribution range of 255 to 1297 m. They are found in central and eastern Ecuador, and have also been reported from Peru.

Appearance 
Males of the species usually grow to 25 cm, while females are somewhat smaller, growing around 23 cm. They are pale brown in colour, (although juveniles are usually yellower) with irregular black crossbars and blotches. They resemble Euspondylus maculatus, the spotted sun tegu, but can be differentiated from that species by colour; E. maculatus has smaller and less pervasive blotches and is generally browner and more uniform in colour.

Protection and rarity 
Euspondylus guentheri is assessed as Least Concern by the IUCN, as it is not subject to significant threat or population decline, although it may be affected by local threats such as deforestation, mining, and agricultural expansion. Furthermore, the species is present in a number of protected areas.

References

Euspondylus
Reptiles of Ecuador
Endemic fauna of Ecuador
Reptiles described in 1881
Taxa named by Arthur William Edgar O'Shaughnessy